The Battle of Bhima Koregaon is an upcoming Indian Hindi-language period war romantic drama film directed and produced by Ramesh Thete under his banner Ramesh Thete Films. It depicts the events that took place during the Battle of Koregaon. The film stars Arjun Rampal as a Mahar warrior Sidhnak Inamdar, and Digangana Suryavanshi and Super Singer Junior 2019 Winner Pranjal Biswas being the main singer.

Cast
 Arjun Rampal as Sidhnak Mahar Inamdar, a Mahar warrior
 Digangana Suryavanshi
 Sunny Leone as Kanta
 Abhimanyu Singh as Baji Rao II
 Krushna Abhishek
 Govind Namdev as Bapu Gokhale
 Ashok Samarth
 Rishi Sharma
 Milind Gunaji
 Yatin Karyekar
 Nataliya Kozhenova

See also
The Battle of Bhima Koregaon: An Unending Journey

References

External links 
 
 

Upcoming Hindi-language films
Upcoming films
Films postponed due to the COVID-19 pandemic
Indian historical action films
Indian historical drama films
Historical epic films
History of India on film
Biographical action films